Oct. 31 - Eastern Orthodox liturgical calendar - Nov. 2

All fixed commemorations below celebrated on November 14 by Orthodox Churches on the Old Calendar.

For November 1st, Orthodox Churches on the Old Calendar commemorate the Saints listed on October 19.

Saints
 Holy Wonderworkers and Unmercenaries Cosmas and Damian of Mesopotamia and their mother Venerable Theodota of Mesopotamia (c. 287)
 Martyrs Cyrenia and Juliana in Cilicia (305)
 Hieromartyr John the Bishop and James the Presbyter of Persia (345)
 Martyrs Caesarius, Dacius, Sabbas, Sabinian, Agrippa, Adrian, and Thomas at Damascus (7th century)
 Saint Theolepte, martyr.
 Martyrs Cyprian and Juliana

Pre-Schism Western saints
 Martyr Mary the Slave Girl (c. 117-138)
 Saint Austromoine (Austremonius, Stremoine), first Bishop of Clermont-Ferrand and "Apostle of Auvergne"  (c. 250)
 Saint Benignus of Dijon, Priest and Apostle, of Burgundy (c. 272)
 Martyrs Caesarius, a Deacon of Africa, together with Julian, a local presbyter, martyred at Terracina in Italy (c. 284-305)
 Saint Maturinus (Mathurin), confessor, French exorcist and missionary, apostle and patron of Gâtinais (c. 300)
 Saint Marcellus, 9th Bishop of Paris (c. 430)
 Saint Amabilis of Riom (475)
 Saint Cledwyn (Clydwyn), patron saint of Llangedwyn in Clwyd in Wales (5th century)
 Saint Pabiali of Wales, patron-saint of Partypallai in Wales (5th/6th century)
 Saint Dingad of Llandingat (5th century)
 Saint Vigor, disciple of St Vedast, became Bishop of Bayeux, resolutely opposed paganism (c. 537)
 Martyr Hermeningild the Goth, Prince of Spain (586)
 Saint Gwythian (Gothian, Gocianus) of Cornwall (6th century)
 Saint Cadfan, Abbot of Tywyn and Bardsey (6th century)
 Saint Caillin, a disciple of St Aidan of Ferns in Ireland (6th century)
 Saint Ceitho, one of five brothers, all saints in Wales (6th century)
 Saint Licinius of Angers (Lesin, Lezin), chosen Bishop of Angers in 586 and consecrated by St Gregory of Tours (c. 616)  (see also: February 13)
 Saint Caesarius, Bishop of Clermont in France (c. 627)
 Saint Floribert (Florbert), Abbot of monasteries in Ghent, Mont-Blandin and Saint-Bavon in Belgium (c. 660)
 Saint Genesius of Lyon (c. 679)
 Saint Severinus, a monk who lived as a hermit in Tivoli in Italy (c. 699)
 Saint Germanus of Montfort, born in Montfort in France, became a monk at the monastery of Savigny, reposed as a hermit (c. 906-1000)

Post-Schism Orthodox saints
 Venerable James of Mount Athos and his two disciples James the Deacon and Dionysius the Monk (1520)
 Venerable Saint David of Euboea (1589)
 New Virgin-Martyr Helen of Sinope (18th century)

New martyrs and confessors
 Hieromartyrs Alexander (Smirnov), and Theodore (Remezov), Priests (1918)
 New Hieromartyr Sergius (Zverev), Archbishop of Elets and Melitopol (1937)
 New Hieromartyr Alexander Shalay, Priest (1937)
 New Hieromartyr Demetrius (Ovechkin), Priest of Perm  (1937)
 Virgin-martyr Elizabeth Samovskoy (1937)
 Martyr Peter Ignatov (1941)

Other commemorations
 Translation of the relics of Boniface, enlightener of Germany (755)
 Repose of Elder Hilarion of Valaam and Sarov (1841)

Icon gallery

Notes

References

Sources 
 November 1/14. Orthodox Calendar (PRAVOSLAVIE.RU).
 November 14 / November 1. HOLY TRINITY RUSSIAN ORTHODOX CHURCH (A parish of the Patriarchate of Moscow).
 November 1. OCA - The Lives of the Saints.
 November 1. Latin Saints of the Orthodox Patriarchate of Rome.
 The Roman Martyrology. Transl. by the Archbishop of Baltimore. Last Edition, According to the Copy Printed at Rome in 1914. Revised Edition, with the Imprimatur of His Eminence Cardinal Gibbons. Baltimore: John Murphy Company, 1916. pp. 337–338.
 Rev. Richard Stanton. A Menology of England and Wales, or, Brief Memorials of the Ancient British and English Saints Arranged According to the Calendar, Together with the Martyrs of the 16th and 17th Centuries. London: Burns & Oates, 1892. p. 521.
Greek Sources
 Great Synaxaristes:  1 ΝΟΕΜΒΡΙΟΥ. ΜΕΓΑΣ ΣΥΝΑΞΑΡΙΣΤΗΣ.
  Συναξαριστής. 1 Νοεμβρίου. ECCLESIA.GR. (H ΕΚΚΛΗΣΙΑ ΤΗΣ ΕΛΛΑΔΟΣ). 
Russian Sources
  14 ноября (1 ноября). Православная Энциклопедия под редакцией Патриарха Московского и всея Руси Кирилла (электронная версия). (Orthodox Encyclopedia - Pravenc.ru).
  1 ноября по старому стилю / 14 ноября по новому стилю. Русская Православная Церковь - Православный церковный календарь на 2018 год.
  1 ноября (ст.ст.) 14 ноября 2013 (нов. ст.). Русская Православная Церковь Отдел внешних церковных связей. (DECR).

November in the Eastern Orthodox calendar